Antonio González (born 3 May 1936) is a Paraguayan footballer. He played in six matches for the Paraguay national football team in 1967. He was also part of Paraguay's squad for the 1967 South American Championship.

References

External links
 

1936 births
Living people
Paraguayan footballers
Paraguay international footballers
Place of birth missing (living people)
Association football forwards